This article concerns the period 449 BC – 440 BC.

References